Vinícius is a Portuguese given name from the Roman family name Vinicius, possibly derived from Latin vinum "wine". Notable people with the name include:

Lucius Vinicius, Roman consul in 33 BC
Marcus Vinicius, Roman consul in 19 BC, Roman general and friend of the emperor Augustus
Lucius Vinicius, Roman consul in 5 BC
Publius Vinicius, Roman consul in 2 AD
Marcus Vinicius, Roman consul in 30 AD. In 33 AD he married Julia Livilla 
Vinicius de Moraes (born 1913), Brazilian musician, poet, composer, playwright and diplomat
Vinícius (footballer, born 1964), Brazilian footballer known as Vinicius
Vinícius (footballer, born 1977), full name Vinícius Conceição da Silva, Brazilian football centre-back
Vinícius Bergantin (born 1980), Brazilian footballer known as Vinícius
Vinícius (footballer, born 1982), full name Carlos Vinicius Neves da Silva, Brazilian football defender
Vinícius da Silva (born 1982), Brazilian football right-back
Vinícius (footballer, born June 1983), full name Vinícius Rodrigues Tomaz da Silva Almeida, Brazilian football midfielder
Vinícius (footballer, born September 1983), full name Vinícius Ferreira Orlando, Brazilian football centre-back
Vinícius (footballer, born 1985), full name Vinícius Barrivieira, Brazilian football goalkeeper
Vinícius (footballer, born 1986), Brazilian footballer known as Vinicius
Vinícius (footballer, born January 1988), full name Vinícius Alberto Nunes, Brazilian football left-back
Vinícius (footballer, born December 1988), full name Vinícius Ferreira de Souza, Brazilian football attacking midfielder
Vinicius (footballer, born 1989), full name Vinicius Galvão Leal, Brazilian football striker
Vinícius Goes, (born 1991), Brazilian footballer known as Vinicius
Vinícius (footballer, born 1993), full name Vinícius Santos Silva, Brazilian football winger
Carlos Vinícius (born 1995), Brazilian footballer known as Vinicius
Vinícius (Portuguese footballer) (born 1995), Portuguese footballer
Vinicius (footballer, born 26 January 1995), full name Luis Vinicius da Silva Matos, Brazilian football defender
Vinicius (footballer, born 1998), Brazilian footballer
Vinícius Jaú (born 1998), Brazilian football forward
Vinícius Júnior (born 2000), Brazilian footballer
Paulo Vinícius (born 1990), Hungarian footballer

Fictional characters 
Marcus Vinicius, main character in Quo Vadis, an 1896 Polish novel by Henryk Sienkiewicz, and the fictional son of the historical Marcus Vinicius

See also 
Vinicius (album), a recording by Vinicius Cantuária
Vinicius, the mascot of the 2016 Summer Olympics; named after Vinicius de Moraes

Ancient Roman nomina